Nymph and Shepherd (Italian Ninfa e pastore; German: Nymphe und Schäfer), also called Shepherd and Nymph, is an oil painting by the Venetian master Titian, made about 1570. The painting is in the collection of the Kunsthistorisches Museum in Vienna.

Provenance 
 1636—In the collection of Bartolomeo della Nave, in Venice; 
 1638–1649—In the collection of James Hamilton, 1st Duke of Hamilton;
 1660—In the collection of Archduke Leopold Wilhelm of Austria.

Gallery

References

Further reading 

 Gronau, Georg (1904). Titian. London: Duckworth and Co; New York: Charles Scribner's Sons. pp. 198–199, 277, 317. 
 Ricketts, Charles (1910). Titian. London: Methuen & Co. Ltd. pp. 150–152, 165, 176, plate clxvi. 

Mythological paintings by Titian
1570s paintings
Paintings in the collection of the Kunsthistorisches Museum
Nude art